Moses J. Brings Plenty (b. 4 September 1969) is an Oglala Lakota television, film, and stage actor, as well as a traditional drummer and singer. He is best known for his portrayal as "Mo" in the television series Yellowstone.

Background
Moses Brings Plenty was born on the Pine Ridge Reservation, in South Dakota. He is a direct descendant of Brings Plenty, an Oglala Lakota warrior who fought in the Battle of Little Big Horn. His wife is Sara Ann Haney-Brings Plenty. His nephew Cole Brings Plenty portrays Pete Plenty Clouds in two episodes of 1923.

Acting career
As an actor, he has played bit parts in Hidalgo, Thunderheart, and Pirates of the Caribbean.  He also played Quanah Parker in the History Channel documentary Comanche Warrior, which was filmed on the Wild Horse Sanctuary in the southern Black Hills, as well as playing Crazy Horse on The History Channel's "Investigating History" documentary, Who Killed Crazy Horse and BBC "Custer's Last Stand". He acted in Rez Bomb, considered to be the first movie with a universal storyline set on a reservation. Rez Bomb has been part on the international film festival circuit instead of playing strictly to Native American film festivals, which is a major breakthrough for Native cinema.

In addition to doing some theater work in Nebraska, he also portrayed an Apache warrior in the 2011 science fiction western film Cowboys & Aliens.

Brings Plenty is concerned about providing accurate representations of Native peoples in mass media. "Young people told me they don’t see our people on TV. Then it hit me, they are right. Where are our indigenous people, people who are proud of who they are?" he says. Brings Plenty also works behind the scenes on Yellowstone and its spin-off prequels 1883 and 1923 as Taylor Sheirdan's American Indian Affairs Coordinator to make sure that each show appropriately represents Native culture.

Music, dance, and modeling career
Brings Plenty has modeled for Ed Hardy and John Yaeger.

Moses Brings Plenty played drums for the band Brulé, who combines traditional Native American drums and flute with contemporary musical instruments.

He performs with and drums for the Many Moccasins Dance Troupe, based in Winnebago, Nebraska that combines modern Native American dance with powwow dances.

He has performed for charity events such as Project Lighthouse, who provides warm clothing and bedding to northern Indian reservations.

Moses has appeared in several episodes of 2018's Yellowstone (U.S. TV series) series on Paramount Network.

Television
Moses Brings Plenty was one of the experts who tested/displayed the weapons and tactics used by Oglala Lakota war leader Crazy Horse on an episode in the third season of Spike TV's Deadliest Warrior. He also appeared in the sixth episode of the fourth season of AMC's Hell on Wheels. He also appears in all seven episodes of the 2020 historical drama miniseries, The Good Lord Bird.

References

Further reading 
Elliott, Michael A. Custerology: The Enduring Legacy of the Indian Wars and George Armstrong Custer. Chicago: University of Chicago Press, 2008. .

External links
Homepage

1969 births
Living people
 Native American male actors
Oglala people
People from Rapid City, South Dakota